
Laguna San Roque is a lake in the Iténez Province, Beni Department, Bolivia. At an elevation of 190 m, its surface area is 4.5 km².

References 

Lakes of Beni Department